Francisco da Costa Menezes Jackson (born 21 January 1987), known as Jackson Caucaia, is a Brazilian footballer who plays for Caucaia Esporte Clube, as a defensive midfielder.

Honours
Ituano
Campeonato Paulista: 2014
Horizonte
Copa Fares Lopes: 2010
Caucaia
Campeonato Cearense 3ª Divisão: 2009

References

External links

Jackson Caucaia at ZeroZero

1987 births
Living people
Sportspeople from Ceará
Brazilian footballers
Association football midfielders
Campeonato Brasileiro Série A players
Campeonato Brasileiro Série B players
Campeonato Brasileiro Série C players
Clube Atlético Mineiro players
Fortaleza Esporte Clube players
Ituano FC players
Clube Atlético Bragantino players
CR Vasco da Gama players
Clube Náutico Capibaribe players
Figueirense FC players
Ceará Sporting Club players
ABC Futebol Clube players
Ferroviário Atlético Clube (CE) players
Horizonte Futebol Clube players
Caucaia Esporte Clube players